Routledge is a British multinational publisher. It was founded in 1836 by George Routledge, and specialises in providing academic books, journals and online resources in the fields of the humanities, behavioural science, education, law, and social science.
The company publishes approximately 1,800 journals and 5,000 new books each year and their backlist encompasses over 70,000 titles. Routledge is claimed to be the largest global academic publisher within humanities and social sciences.

In 1998, Routledge became a subdivision and imprint of its former rival, Taylor & Francis Group (T&F), as a result of a £90-million acquisition deal from Cinven, a venture capital group which had purchased it two years previously for £25 million. Following the merger of Informa and T&F in 2004, Routledge became a publishing unit and major imprint within the Informa "academic publishing" division. Routledge is headquartered in the main T&F office in Milton Park, Abingdon, Oxfordshire and also operates from T&F offices globally including in Philadelphia, Melbourne, New Delhi, Singapore, and Beijing.

History
The firm originated in 1836, when the London bookseller George Routledge published an unsuccessful guidebook, The Beauties of Gilsland, with his brother-in-law W. H. (William Henry) Warne as assistant. In 1848, the pair entered the booming market for selling inexpensive imprints of works of fiction to rail travellers, in the style of the German Tauchnitz family, which became known as the "Railway Library".

The venture was a success as railway usage grew, and it eventually led to Routledge, along with W H Warne's brother Frederick Warne, to found the company, George Routledge & Co. in 1851.	
The following year in 1852, the company gained lucrative business through selling reprints of Uncle Tom's Cabin, (in the public domain in the UK) which in turn enabled it to pay author Edward Bulwer-Lytton £20,000 for a 10-year lease allowing sole rights to print all 35 of his works including 19 of his novels to be sold cheaply as part of their "Railway Library" series.

The company was restyled in 1858 as Routledge, Warne & Routledge when George Routledge's son, Robert Warne Routledge, entered the partnership. Frederick Warne eventually left the company after the death of his brother W. H. Warne in May 1859 (died aged 37). Gaining rights to some titles, he founded Frederick Warne & Co. in 1865, which became known for its Beatrix Potter books. In July 1865, George Routledge's son Edmund Routledge became a partner, and the firm became George Routledge & Sons.

By 1899, the company was running close to bankruptcy. Following a successful restructuring in 1902 by scientist Sir William Crookes, banker Arthur Ellis Franklin, William Swan Sonnenschein as managing director, and others, however, it was able to recover and began to acquire and merge with other publishing companies including J. C. Nimmo Ltd. in 1903. In 1912, the company took over the management of Kegan Paul, Trench, Trübner & Co., the descendant of companies founded by Charles Kegan Paul, Alexander Chenevix Trench, Nicholas Trübner, and George Redway.

These early 20th-century acquisitions brought with them lists of notable scholarly titles, and from 1912 onward,  the company became increasingly concentrated in the academic and scholarly publishing business under the imprint "Kegan Paul Trench Trubner", as well as reference, fiction and mysticism. In 1947, George Routledge and Sons finally merged with Kegan Paul Trench Trubner (the umlaut had been quietly dropped in the First World War) under the name of Routledge & Kegan Paul. Using C. K. Ogden and later Karl Mannheim as advisers the company was soon particularly known for its titles in philosophy, psychology and the social sciences.

In 1985, Routledge & Kegan Paul joined with Associated Book Publishers (ABP), which was later acquired by International Thomson in 1987. Under Thomson's ownership, Routledge's name and operations were retained, with the additions of backlists from Methuen, Tavistock Publications, Croom Helm and Unwin Hyman. In 1996, a management buyout financed by the European private equity firm Cinven saw Routledge operating as an independent company once again. Just two years later, Cinven and Routledge's directors accepted a deal for Routledge's acquisition by Taylor & Francis Group (T&F), with the Routledge name being retained as an imprint and subdivision.

In 2004, T&F became a division within Informa plc after a merger. Routledge continues as a primary publishing unit and imprint within Informa's 'academic publishing' division, publishing academic humanities and social science books, journals, reference works and digital products. Routledge has grown considerably as a result of organic growth and acquisitions of other publishing companies and other publishers' titles by its parent company. Humanities and social sciences titles acquired by T&F from other publishers are rebranded under the Routledge imprint.

People
The English publisher Fredric Warburg was a commissioning editor at Routledge during the early 20th century. Novelist Nina Stibbe, author of Love, Nina, worked at the company as a commissioning editor in the 1990s. Cultural studies editor William Germano served as vice-president and publishing director for two decades before becoming dean of the humanities at Cooper Union.

Authors 
Routledge has published works from Adorno, Bohm, Butler, Derrida, Einstein, Foucault, Freud, Al Gore, Hayek, Jung, Levi-Strauss, McLuhan, Malinowski, Marcuse, Popper, Johan Rockström, Russell, Sartre, and Wittgenstein. The republished works of some of these authors have appeared as part of the Routledge Classics and Routledge Great Minds series. Competitors to the series are Verso Books' Radical Thinkers, Penguin Classics, and Oxford World's Classics.

Publications 

Routledge has been criticised for a pricing structure which "will limit readership to the privileged few", as opposed to options for open access offered by DOAJ, Unpaywall, and DOAB.

Reference works 
Taylor and Francis closed down the Routledge print encyclopaedia division in 2006. Some of its publications were:
 Routledge Encyclopedia of Philosophy, by Edward Craig (1998), in 10 volumes, but now online.
 Encyclopedia of Ethics, by Lawrence C. Becker and Charlotte B. Becker (2002), in three volumes.

Reference works by Europa Publications, published by Routledge:
 Europa World Year Book
 International Who's Who
 Europa World of Learning

Many of Routledge's reference works are published in print and electronic formats as Routledge Handbooks and have their own dedicated website: Routledge Handbooks Online. The company also publishes several online encyclopedias and collections of digital content such as Routledge Encyclopedia of Philosophy, Routledge Encyclopedia of Modernism, Routledge Performance Archive, and South Asia Archive.

Book series 
 The Broadway Travellers (1926–37) edited by Eileen Power and Edward Denison Ross.
 Colloquial Series of Multimedia Language Courses
Essential Grammars (since 1999)
 Morley's Universal Library (also known as: Routledge's Universal Library) (1883–88)
 The Muses' Library (1904–1940; 1950–1980)
 established in 1891 by Lawrence & Bullen as a series of fine editions of poetry until L&B folded in 1900, Routledge revived the series in 1904 with reprints and new titles. Over the years parallel editions were published in the US by Charles Scribner’s Sons, E.P. Dutton and Harvard University Press
 The Republic of Letters
 Routledge's Railway Library (1848–99)
 were sold through W. H. Smith's bookstalls on railway platforms; in 50 years 1,277 books were published, most as pictorial hardbacks, with some bestsellers re-released as cheaper paperbacks. Authors included Edward Bulwer Lytton, James Fenimore Cooper, Jane Austen, Benjamin Disraeli, Henry Fielding, Frances Trollope, William Harrison Ainsworth, Alexandre Dumas, and Victor Hugo

References

Citations

Sources

External links

 
 History of Routledge
 Routledge Revivals: Reprints from humanities and social sciences publications, from the backlists of Routledge imprints.
 Routledge & Kegan Paul Archives: Ledgers, authors' agreements, printed catalogues and other papers 1853–1973, University College London.
 Records of Routledge & Kegan Paul: Correspondence files covering the period 1935 to 1990, as well as review files 1950s–1990s, Special Collections, University of Reading Library.
 Archives of George Routledge & Company 1853-1902, Chadwyck-Healey Ltd, 1973. 6 reels of microfilm and printed index. (Available from ProQuest)
 Archives of Kegan Paul, Trench, Trubner and Henry S. King 1858-1912, Chadwyck-Healey Ltd,1973. 27 reels of microfilm with index on microfiche. (Available from Proquest)

Academic publishing companies
Book publishing companies of the United Kingdom
Companies based in Oxfordshire
Reference publishers
Vale of White Horse
1998 mergers and acquisitions
1851 establishments in England
Publishing companies established in 1851